Julian Carey Dixon (August 8, 1934 – December 8, 2000) was an American Democratic politician from California who was a member of the California State Assembly from 1973 to 1978 and then a member of the United States House of Representatives from 1979 until his death. He chaired the House Ethics Committee from 1985 to 1991.

Biography
A member of the aristocratic Syphax family, Dixon was born in Washington D.C. and served in the United States Army from 1957 to 1960. He graduated from California State University, Los Angeles in 1962. He was elected to the California State Assembly as a Democrat in 1972, and served in that body for three terms. Dixon was elected to the House of Representatives in 1978. In 1983 he joined with 7 other Congressional Representatives to sponsor a resolution to impeach Ronald Reagan over his sudden and unexpected invasion of Grenada. He chaired the rules committee at the 1984 Democratic National Convention and the ethics probe into Speaker Jim Wright. Dixon won re-election to the 107th United States Congress, but died at a hospital in Marina Del Rey, California on December 8, 2000, aged 66, following a heart attack.

The busy 7th Street / Metro Center / Julian Dixon transfer station for the A Line, B Line, D Line, and E Line in downtown Los Angeles is named after Dixon, with a plaque commemorating his role in obtaining the federal funding that enabled construction of the Metro Rail system. His alma mater, Southwestern University School of Law, in 2004 opened the Julian C. Dixon Courtroom and Advocacy Center in the former Bullocks Wilshire building. The Culver City branch of the Los Angeles County Library is also named in his honor, Culver City Julian Dixon Library.

The third revised edition of Black Americans in Congress 1870-2007 (House Document 108-224, Serial Set v.14904) is dedicated to the memory of Dixon. Remarks requesting this were made by several of his colleagues March 21, 2001 on the House floor during  consideration of House Concurrent Resolution 43 of the 107th Congress which ordered the printing of the revised edition.

Dixon was a member of Alpha Phi Alpha fraternity. He was interred at Inglewood Park Cemetery, Inglewood, California.

See also

 Hal Bernson, Los Angeles City Council member, 1979–2003, received first Julian C. Dixon Award for public service
 List of African-American United States representatives
 List of United States Congress members who died in office

References

External links

Julian C. Dixon Courtroom and Advocacy Center

 
Join California Julian C. Dixon

|-

|-

|-

|-

|-

1934 births
2000 deaths
20th-century American politicians
African-American members of the United States House of Representatives
African-American United States Army personnel
African-American state legislators in California
Burials at Inglewood Park Cemetery
California State University, Los Angeles alumni
Democratic Party members of the California State Assembly
Democratic Party members of the United States House of Representatives from California
Military personnel from Washington, D.C.
Politicians from Los Angeles
Politicians from Washington, D.C.
Southwestern Law School alumni
United States Army soldiers
20th-century African-American politicians
African-American men in politics
Syphax family